Belthorn is a small moorland village situated to the south-east of Blackburn in Lancashire, England. Belthorn has a primary school, Belthorn Academy, and a large playing field with a children's recreational area.

The village has two pubs: the community-owned, recently reopened Dog Inn and the Pack Horse (now named Marco Polo); the Pack Horse is an Italian restaurant and the Dog Inn serves pub food. The houses are mainly old weavers' cottages. Most of the village is in Hyndburn, though some of the houses, including those higher up in the village, are in Blackburn with Darwen.

Governance 
The village is divided between the unitary authority of Blackburn with Darwen and the district of Hyndburn, both of which have borough status. The portion of the village within Blackburn with Darwen is largely within the ancient parish (now a civil parish) of Yate and Pickup Bank, with a small area in the north of the village, formerly in the parish of Lower Darwen.

The part of the village in Hyndburn was formerly part of the township of Oswaldtwistle.

External links

Villages in Lancashire
Geography of Blackburn with Darwen
Geography of Hyndburn